Friends of the Bride were a short-lived London-based indie pop band (sometimes shortened to 'FoTB').

Consisting of Bobby Grindrod (vocals), Osamu Yano (guitar), Kerin Smith (bass) and Billy Reeves a.k.a. Brian Feltham (drums); the band won the 2006 London leg of the BBC's Electric Proms 'Next Stage' competition and secured their first gig as part of the festival (which also featured performances by The Who, James Brown and Paul Weller). Drawing from a diverse range of influences that included 1960s jazz, Northern soul and yé-yé as well as new wave music, garage rock and Anthony Newley, the band employed a traditional 'Tin Pan Alley'-inspired songwriting approach.

Despite their traditional indie format (guitar, bass, drums and vocals), front man Bobby Grindrod was known for his unique jazz-influenced vocal style and they were cited by The Times as "head[ing] the nu croon scene". In 2007, Grindrod's unusually smart appearance (influenced by early to mid-1960s fashion) prompted London's Metro newspaper to run a full page style feature on him.

Such shameless appreciation for 1960s styling has led to accusations of 'retroism', however the band refuted this; claiming that all contemporary music is clearly and heavily indebted to the past and therefore "[i]n its current usage, 'retro' is a misleading and repressive term that should be avoided at all costs".

Friends of the Bride released two singles ("Buckle Up, Sunshine!" and "So, You Think You Can Dance?") on London's Young and Lost Club label in 2007 as well as contributing "You Can't Take Him Anywhere" and "Hey Buddy" to a split EP (also featuring contributions from Manchester electro-pop group Modernaire) on Brainlove Records in 2008.

Between 2000 and 2006, Bobby Grindrod fronted Bath-based new wave/garage rock outfit, The Fog Band who released an acclaimed EP The Law of the Sea on Bath's Purr Records. Initially, his vocal approach was heavily influenced by 1960s rhythm and blues but as the band progressed he began to experiment with a 'cleaner' vocal approach (retained and developed in Friends of the Bride). Fog Band songwriter Oli Daltrey (son of Peter Daltrey, lead singer of 1960s psychedelic band Kaleidoscope) began to accommodate this development in songs like "The Cummerbund Years" and an exciting future beckoned. Despite this, the band soon became inexplicably defunct.

In 2006, Grindrod contributed to the short-lived music project 'A Conversation Piece' alongside Pagan Wanderer Lu and Simon Love (lead singer of The Loves). He also provided some backing vocals and narration on The Loves' second album Technicolour, in the same year.

Billy Reeves and Kerin Smith previously performed in '90s indie band theaudience alongside Sophie Ellis-Bextor.

Discography

EPs 
 You Can't Take Him Anywhere / Hey Buddy (Brainlove Records, March 2008)

Singles 
 "Want In?" / "Cut Down on My Friends" (Feltham Records, November 2006)
 "Buckle Up, Sunshine!" / "End of Loneliness" (Young and Lost Club, April 2007)
 "So, You Think You Can Dance" / "I've Had My Moments" (Young and Lost Club, November 2007)

Compilation appearances 
 Sound of an Era II on Vinyl Junkie Records, Japan; Oct 2007 (So, You Think You Can Dance?)
 Two Thousand and Ace on Brainlove Records, UK; Jul 2008 (I've Had My Moments)

References

External links
 Friends of the Bride Myspace page
 Friends of the Bride 'Band of the Day' at Guardian.co.uk
 Interview and session for Xfm
Interview with This Is Fake DIY
 Interview with Subba-Cultcha.com
 For He's a brolly good fellow

English pop music groups
British indie pop groups
Musical groups established in 2006
Musical groups disestablished in 2008